Micropyrum is a genus of European and North African plants in the grass family.

 Species
 Micropyrum patens (Brot.) Rothm. ex Pilg. - Spain, Portugal
 Micropyrum tenellum (L.) Link - Spain, Portugal including Madeira, France including Corsica, Italy (Valle d'Aosta, Piedmont, Lombardy, Liguria, Tuscany, Lazio, Campania, Sicily, Sardinia), Germany, Switzerland, Greece, Croatia, Serbia, Bulgaria, Turkey, Slovenia, Algeria, Libya, Morocco

 formerly included
see Castellia Catapodium Vulpia 
 Micropyrum mamoraeum - Catapodium mamoraeum
 Micropyrum tenellum f. aristatum - Vulpia unilateralis
 Micropyrum tenellum var. aristatum - Vulpia unilateralis
 Micropyrum tuberculosum - Castellia tuberculosa

References

Poaceae genera
Pooideae